Hordron Edge stone circle, also known as 'The Seven Stones of Hordron' is a Bronze Age stone circle in Derbyshire, England. It is on the edge of Moscar Moor. Ladybower reservoir is to the west, and Moscar Cross is to the northeast. Seven stones are presently (2017) visible with a further three stones, now recumbent and hidden discovered in 1992. Some authorities believe that the circle might have once comprised 26 stones.

References

External links

Stone circles in Derbyshire